Bennington is a city in Ottawa County, Kansas, United States.  As of the 2020 census, the population of the city was 622.

History

19th century
Bennington was platted in 1878 and grew to a population of over 200 within three years.  The city name comes from one of two sources.  A paper written on the history of Bennington states that Bennington is an Indian name meaning "place of fine trees."  The same article also states that co-city founder George R. Parker gave the town its name after Bennington, Vermont.  The Solomon Valley Railroad, a branch of the Kansas Pacific Railroad, reached Bennington in 1878.

In 1879, the first school was located one half mile south of town.  In 1918, a new school house was built.  In 1938, an auditorium was added; in 1955 a shop was added; and in 1961 a new grade school building was annexed.

Geography
Bennington is located at  (39.033174, -97.593030).

Climate
The climate in this area is characterized by hot, humid summers and generally mild to cool winters.  According to the Köppen Climate Classification system, Bennington has a humid subtropical climate, abbreviated "Cfa" on climate maps.

Demographics

Bennington is part of the Salina Micropolitan Statistical Area.

2010 census
As of the census of 2010, there were 672 people, 261 households, and 188 families residing in the city. The racial makeup of the city was 97.8% White, 0.3% African American, 0.9% Native American, and 1.0% from two or more races. Hispanic or Latino of any race were 1.9% of the population.

There were 261 households, of which 37.2% had children under the age of 18 living with them, 61.7% were married couples living together, 7.7% had a female householder with no husband present, 2.7% had a male householder with no wife present, and 28.0% were non-families. 25.7% of all households were made up of individuals, and 8.8% had someone living alone who was 65 years of age or older. The average household size was 2.57 and the average family size was 3.07.

The median age in the city was 37.4 years. 28.4% of residents were under the age of 18; 6.5% were between the ages of 18 and 24; 27.3% were from 25 to 44; 25% were from 45 to 64; and 12.9% were 65 years of age or older. The gender makeup of the city was 52.8% male and 47.2% female.

2000 census
As of the census of 2000, there were 623 people, 245 households, and 182 families residing in the city. The racial makeup of the city was 97.75% White, 0.16% African American, 0.16% Native American, 0.16% Asian, 0.16% Pacific Islander, 0.32% from other races, and 1.28% from two or more races. Hispanic or Latino of any race were 0.96% of the population.

There were 245 households, out of which 37.6% had children under the age of 18 living with them, 60.8% were married couples living together, 9.8% had a female householder with no husband present, and 25.7% were non-families. 21.6% of all households were made up of individuals, and 10.2% had someone living alone who was 65 years of age or older. The average household size was 2.54 and the average family size was 2.96.

In the city, the population was spread out, with 31.0% under the age of 18, 3.9% from 18 to 24, 31.0% from 25 to 44, 22.2% from 45 to 64, and 12.0% who were 65 years of age or older. The median age was 35 years. For every 100 females, there were 95.9 males. For every 100 females age 18 and over, there were 93.7 males.

The median income for a household in the city was $37,303, and the median income for a family was $45,972. Males had a median income of $32,143 versus $21,429 for females. The per capita income for the city was $15,919. About 5.1% of families and 6.0% of the population were below the poverty line, including 5.8% of those under age 18 and 6.0% of those age 65 or over.

Government
The Bennington government consists of a mayor and five council members.  The council meets the 2nd and 4th Monday of each month at 7 pm.
 City Hall, 121 North Nelson Street.
 U.S. Post Office, 116 North Nelson Street.

Education
The community is served by Twin Valley USD 240 public school district.
 Bennington High School, 301 North Putnam Street.
 Bennington Junior High School, 301 North Putnam Street.
 Bennington Grade School, 223 North Putnam Street.

See also
 List of Nike missile locations
 List of tornadoes in the May 1995 tornado outbreak sequence
 List of tornadoes in the April 6–8, 2006 tornado outbreak
 List of tornadoes in the May 2007 Tornado Outbreak
 List of tornadoes in the tornado outbreak of May 26–31, 2013

References

Further reading

External links
 City of Bennington
 Bennington - Directory of Public Officials
 , from Hatteberg's People on KAKE TV news
 , from Hatteberg's People on KAKE TV news
 Bennington city map, KDOT

Cities in Kansas
Cities in Ottawa County, Kansas
Salina, Kansas micropolitan area
1878 establishments in Kansas
Populated places established in 1878